SA8 may refer to:

 SA-8 Gecko, the NATO reporting name for the 9K33 Osa surface-to-air missile system
 SA8 (detergent), the brand of laundry detergent sold by Amway
 SA-8, a rocket launch used to launch mission AS-104, a test flight in the U.S. NASA Apollo Program moon project
 Stits SA-8 Skeeto, an ultralight aircraft
 post code SA8, a post code in Swansea, Wales, UK

See also

 Fiat SA8/75, a Fiat Aviazione aircraft engine

 SA (disambiguation)